Mohamed Charfi (11 October 1936 – 6 June 2008) was a Tunisian academic and politician who served as Minister of Education of Tunisia from 1989 to 1994.

Early life 
Charfi was born in Sfax, Tunisia, on October 11, 1936. 

He studied at the Paris Law Faculty. He was an active member of the Tunisia General Student Union (Union générale des étudiants tunisiens) in Paris in the 1960s and cofounded the leftist group Perspectives. He was jailed as a result of his leftist activities.

Career 
Charfi co-founded the Tunisian Human Rights League in 1976. 

He served as Minister of Education under the presidency of Zine El Abidine Ben Ali. One of his first acts as minister was to set up Zaitouna University in 1989 as a religious coeducational institution, and he personally oversaw the university curricular design, which he intended to incorporate "universal values of Islam" and religious tolerance.  Among other educational policies enacted during his tenure was the expansion of teacher training programs, compulsory education, the reduction of Islamic influence in public education, and the elimination of vocational tracks from secondary school.

Personal life 
He was married to Faouzia Charfi.

External links
 Inlassable défenseur des droits de l'homme, Mohamed Charfi est mort rfi June, 07, 2008
 Mohamed Charfi, ministre de l'éducation tunisien de 1989 à 1994 Le Monde, Catherine Simon, June, 18, 2008
 Mohamed Charfi, le droit et les droits Jeune Afrique, June, 16, 2008
 Dr. Mohamed Charfi, UNAOC, June, 6, 2008
  Hommage à Mohamed Charfi France Culture, July, 16, 2008
  M. Charfi, un héros qui a tout d'un homme Leaders, June, 03, 2011

References

1936 births
2008 deaths
Academic staff of Tunis University
Tunisian politicians
20th-century Tunisian lawyers